Motherwell Football Club Women is a Scottish women's football team based in Motherwell, North Lanarkshire. They are members of the Scottish Women's Premier League (SWPL) and currently compete in its top tier, SWPL1, since winning SWPL2 in 2018. For the 2020-21 season are playing their home matches at the Excelsior Stadium in Airdrie, North Lanarkshire.

Previously a separate entity known as Motherwell Ladies Football Club when the team was reformed in 2014, they became an integral part of the professional Motherwell F.C. in 2018 and dropped 'Ladies' from the name in 2019.

History
Reformed in 2014, Motherwell Ladies had a fairly steady first season in the Scottish Woman's Football League 2nd Division, finishing third, but missed out on promotion as Mill United ran away with the title. The Cups were a disappointment, going out at the first stage of both competitions.

Ahead of the 2015 season, the team was able to recruit several ex International players to bolster the squad such as Julie Ferguson, Stacey Cook, Lauren MacMillan, Kirsty McBride and others. The team made an outstanding start, winning every single match during the first half of the season, scoring 176 goals in 18 matches. Including in those games was an impressive 0–4 Scottish Women's Cup win away to SWPL Hutchison Vale. In the same week, the Ladies won their first piece of silverware, beating Rangers Development side 2–6 at Spartan's Ainslie Park.

Returning from the summer break, the team picked up where they left off, beating Edinburgh South L.F.C. 21–0, with recently-signed striker Suzanne Grant netting an astonishing eleven goals on her debut, which brought about national coverage from the likes of Sky Sports. The team followed that with a brilliant comeback in the Scottish Cup Third Round against Glasgow Girls, scoring four times in the last 15 minutes to turn around a 3–0 deficit and book a Quarter Final place against Celtic.

Although an understrength team would eventually lose to Celtic in that Quarter Final, they went on to finish the season in style, securing the 2nd Division South East / West title, in an "invincibles" season, winning 18 games from 18, securing 54 points.

2018 season
After a steady first season in SWPL2, former Glasgow City and Airdrie boss Eddie Wolecki Black was appointed to the role as Head Coach with the club announcing its ambition to get promoted to the top tier in Scottish football.

Eddie immediately appointed his former City staff, Assistant Donald Jennow and Goalkeeping Coach Andy Moran.

A host of signings were announced soon afterwards, with a number of players with international experience joining the club including Emma Black, Suzanne Mulvey, Megan Burns and current Northern Ireland International Kerry Montgomery.

In the team's first match of the 2018 SWPL season, Motherwell beat newly promoted F.C. Kilmarnock Ladies away from home 2-1. After the match Kilmarnock complained that Motherwell had not followed correct SWF procedures. Kilmarnock were subsequently rewarded with a 3-0 win over Motherwell. The result put Kilmarnock top of the SWPL2, albeit briefly as 'Well stormed ahead in the table.

Motherwell would secure the SWPL 2 title with five games of the season remaining, having embarked on a run of 14 wins and a draw following their opening day result being overturned.

The title win was the last act of the Wolecki Black regime, the Head Coach having left to take over the vacant managerial role at Celtic Ladies. Eddie would be replaced by Donald Jennow, who stepped up from his role as assistant to manage the team.

In addition to their excellent league form, 'Well have also progressed to the final of the Scottish Women's Cup. They thrashed both Cumbernauld Colts and Aberdeen by 8-1, before edging out St Johnstone 1-0 in the Quarter Final at McDiarmid Park to book a Semi Final tie against Spartans at Forthbank. Goals from Burns, Montgomery and Russell handed the women of steel a famous 3-1 win and secured a Scottish Cup Final appearance for the first time in 37 years, where they will take on Hibernian at Firhill on Sunday 4 November. Sadly, for 'Well, they weren't able to do the double, losing heavily in the Final in front of almost 2000 fans.

Stadium 

Motherwell moved to K Park in East Kilbride for the start of 2022/2023 season.

For the 2015 season, Motherwell Ladies signed an agreement to play at the John Cumming Stadium in Carluke, but just before the season was about to begin, the Astro pitch was damaged by vandals. As a result, the team played either at Braidhurst High School, Ravenscraig Regional Sports Facility or at Fir Park Stadium. For the 2020–21 season, they are groundsharing at the Excelsior Stadium in Airdrie, North Lanarkshire.

Current squad

Coaching staff
As of 12 July 2021

Achievements

Scottish Women's Premier League 2
Winners (1): 2018
 Scottish Women's Cup
Winners (3): 1973/74, 1979/80, 1980/81
Runners-up (1): 2018
SWFL Second Division Cup
Winners (1): 2015
SWFL 2nd Division South East / West
 Winners (1): 2015

References

External links
Official Motherwell FC website
Official Motherwell LFC Twitter

 
Women's football clubs in Scotland
Sport in Motherwell
Scottish Women's Premier League clubs
Football in North Lanarkshire
2014 establishments in Scotland
Sports clubs established in 2014
Scottish Women's Football League clubs